Darul Uloom London is an 11–19 boys, Islamic, private boarding school and sixth form in Chislehurst, Greater London, England. It is a Darul uloom that was established in 1988.

The school charges fees of £3,500 per year.  All pupils are borders and they have two weekend home trips per month, and parents often visit on other weekends. A "material change" was applied for c. 2017/2018 to increase the number of students to 225 and the school also planned to increase the maximum age to 25.  Ofsted recommended that the request should be refused until safeguarding issues a had been addressed, and in light of the school already exceeding both its registered capacity and age range.

Ofsted reports 
The 2008 Ofsted report recognised the school as "Good", in 2011 it was characterised as "Satisfactory", in 2013 as "Inadequate", in 2014 and 2015 as "Requires Improvement" and in 2017 again "Inadequate".  Later concerns centred on safeguarding issues, and while the interim report of 7 February 2018 indicated substantial improvement, it still fell short of National Minimum Standards in a number of safeguarding areas. Most recently, in January 2020, the school was said to have met all independent school standards.

References

External links 
 
 Independent Schools Directory

Chislehurst
Private schools in the London Borough of Bromley
Private boys' schools in London
Boarding schools in London
Islamic schools in London
Deobandi Islamic universities and colleges
Educational institutions established in 1988
1988 establishments in England